Pandemis orophila is a species of moth of the  family Tortricidae. It is found in Uganda.

References

	

Endemic fauna of Uganda
Moths described in 1965
Pandemis